Callimoxys nigrinus is a species of beetle in the family Cerambycidae. It was described in 2011.

References

Stenopterini
Beetles described in 2011